A terumah, the priestly dues, or more typically, heave offering, is a type of offering in Judaism. The word is generally used for an offering to God, although it is also sometimes used as in ish teramot, a "judge who loves gifts".

The word terumah refers to various types of offerings, but most commonly to terumah gedolah (תרומה גדולה, "great offering"), which must be separated from agricultural produce and given to a kohen (a priest of Aaron's lineage), who must eat it in a state of ritual purity. Those separating the terumah unto the priests must, as a rule, do so also in a state of ritual purity.

Etymology
The word terumah ("lifting up") comes from the verb stem, rum (רוּם, "high" or "to lift up"). The formation of terumah is parallel to the formation of tenufah ('תְּנוּפָה, wave offering) from the verb stem nuf, "to wave," and both are found in the Hebrew Bible. English Bible versions such as the King James Version have in a few verses translated "heave offering," by analogy with "wave offering":

Hebrew Bible
The term occurs seventy-six times in the Biblical Hebrew Masoretic Text of the Hebrew Bible; in the Greek Septuagint it was rendered afieroma (ἀφiαίρoμα), in the 1917 JPS Tanakh it is generally translated "offering"; while in the King James Version (1611) it is also generally translated "offering" but also sometimes "oblation" and four times "heave offering".

The word is used in various contexts throughout the Hebrew Bible, including one use in Proverbs denoting haughtiness or graft (Proverbs 29:4). In most contexts it refers to designating something for a higher purpose, or lifting apart of a quantity from a larger quantity), as in the gifts offered by the Israelites for the inauguration of the Tabernacle (Mishkan) in the Book of Exodus. In the Bible, there are numerous different varieties of gifts for which the term terumah was applied. In halakah (Jewish law), the word terumah by itself was associated with "great offering" (terumah gedolah), the first portion of produce that was required to be separated for consumption by a kohen (priest).

There were two groups of terumot:
 Sacrifice/redemption of the first-born:
 Pidyon haben, the redemption of first-born male children. (Note that pidyon haben redemption-monies are still given to Kohanim, and the Kohen (priest) still customarily lifts the redemption coins up as part of the contemporary pidyon haben ceremony, but the "heave" element is not a requirement for a valid pidyon haben to occur in the absence of a Temple in Jerusalem under contemporary Jewish law.)
 Tithe of Bikkurim (First-fruits) (Not done in the absence of a Temple in Jerusalem).
 General tithes:
 The general offering (terumah) or the "great offering" (terumah gedolah) was a portion of the finished grain, wine and oil separated for the Jewish priest prior to the "first tithe" (maaser rishon) separated for a Levite. Unlike the maaser rishon, the Torah did not specify any minimum measure for a terumah offering; hence, even one grain of barley could satisfy the requirement to separate terumah. A passage in the Book of Ezekiel suggests that the terumah gedolah should consist of 1/50 of the owner's grain, wine or oil.
 The Mitzvah of Challah (מצוות תרומת חלה mitzvat terumat challah) Contemporary practice is to burn rather than give to the priest.
 Portion of gift offerings, of slaughter offerings, which were allocated to the priests.
 Portion of the terumat hamaaser, the tithe of the tithes or Levite tithe, which applies only to produce grown in the Land of Israel.

Terumah gedolah
Terumah gedolah must be given to the Jewish priest, and is considered one of the twenty-four kohanic gifts. The consumption of terumah (both terumah gedolah and terumat hamaaser) is restricted by numerous Torah-based commandments, and could be eaten by priests, their families, and their servants. The terumah may be consumed only in a state of ritual purity.

According to Hezekiah ben Manoah, this terumah is called "great" (Hebrew gedolah) because it is the first of all tithes given on produce, and thus is given from the "greatest quantity of produce" before any other gift is given.

The Mishnah, Tosefta, and Gemara include a tract entitled Terumot which deals with the laws regulating terumah. The rabbis of the late Second Temple period added certain strictures to its consumption, requiring that the terumah be burnt (and not consumed) if a priest or Israelite who touched the terumah suspected that he had passed in close proximity to a grave (Hebrew language: Beit ha-Peras), and was uncertain if he had contracted corpse uncleanness.

According to Jewish law, the terumah gedolah could only be separated from the non-tithed produce (tevel), and terumat maaser only be separated from maaser rishon by its owner, or an authorized, legally permissible agent; minors, deaf-mutes, the mentally ill and non-Jews were not obligated to perform such separation (Terumot 1:1). However, while non-Jews could not act as agents for Jews to separate terumah, the terumah owned by and separated by non-Jews was considered valid and had the status and sanctity of terumah (Terumot 3:9). Based in part on the measures described by Ezekiel, Jewish law set the minimum amounts of the great offering at 1/60 of the finished produce for a poor person, 1/50 for the average person, and 1/40 for the generous. The terumat maaser was always 10% of the maaser rishon.

The Talmud opens with a discussion of when the Shema Yisrael ("Hear O Israel") prayer should be recited. The Mishnah states that it should be recited when priests who were tamei (טָמֵא ritually impure) are able to enter the Temple to eat their terumah.

Purity
As a rule, terumah that is designated for the priests must be separated in a state of ritual purity. In addition, it is forbidden to intentionally cause terumah to become impure. This means that one is forbidden to touch terumah unless one of two criteria are met (see Makhshirin): a) the food is dry and was never wetted with water or another of the seven liquids (water, wine, oil, dew, milk, blood, or honey), or b) the food had previously been wetted and touched by an impure Jew before or after it was imbued with the holiness of terumah. Regardless, it is regarded as forbidden today for any person to eat trumah, in part as a consequence of the widespread prevalence of Tumat HaMet. 

Olive oil that is used to light therewith the lamps and which has become impure, known as shemen s'reifah, may still be given unto a priest as part of his priestly dues. All people nowadays are presumed to be impure due to Corpse uncleanness, so terumah cannot currently be eaten by priests. Nevertheless, it is permitted to designate fruit and vegetable produce as terumah and to give it to the livestock belonging to a priest.

See also
 Numbers 31 § Fate of the 32 virgins
 Shlach - 37th weekly Torah portion (Numbers 15:17-21)
 Terumah (parashah) - the nineteenth weekly portion of the Torah. It primarily contains the instructions on how to create the Tabernacle.

Notes

Jewish sacrificial law
Jewish agrarian laws
Land of Israel laws in Judaism
Priesthood (Judaism)
Positive Mitzvoth
Tithes in Judaism
Twenty-four kohanic gifts